The Jessi Slaughter cyberbullying case was an American criminal case that revolved around an 11-year-old named Jessica Leonhardt (known online as "Jessi Slaughter" and "Kerligirl13"), whose profanity-laden videos went viral on Stickam and YouTube in 2010. The videos were made in response to accusations that a friend had raped Leonhardt, and that Leonhardt had a sexual relationship with the lead singer of the electropop band Blood on the Dance Floor, a man named Dahvie Vanity (real name Jesus David Torres) while Leonhardt was a minor. This resulted in a campaign of telephone and internet harassment against Leonhardt and their family, chiefly attributed to 4chan users and members of the internet-based group Anonymous. It began a debate about the dangers of anonymity on the Internet, and whether or not the Internet is a safe environment for minors, and all people in general.

Leonhardt told The Independent in 2016: "I wouldn't even call what happened to me cyberbullying, it was straight up harassment and stalking. It started out as cyberbullying but it quickly evolved." Vanity has repeatedly denied all of the allegations against him. He has also denied knowing Leonhardt or any of the other victims that have accused him of sexual assault, rape, and child molestation and has stated that Leonhardt had a mental illness. The song "You Done Goofed" from the Blood on the Dance Floor album Epic is about Leonhardt and Vanity's alleged experiences with them.

Assigned female at birth, Leonhardt later came out as transgender and non-binary, now going by the name Damien Leonhardt. In 2018, they accused Vanity of child sexual abuse and rape in a post on social media site Tumblr during their alleged relationship, when Leonhardt was 10 years old. One year later, an additional 21 women accused Vanity of sexual assault, child molestation, and rape, with many of them saying the attacks took place while they were under the age of consent.

Videos 
Leonhardt began making YouTube videos when they were 10 years old, discussing "fashion, clothes and local drama that was happening within the party scene" which were uploaded on their friend's webcam. Leonhardt posted their first popular video just before their twelfth birthday in response to two claims made on StickyDrama and MySpace: the first being that they were a victim of rape, and the second being that they were having an underaged sexual relationship with the lead singer of the electronic band Blood on the Dance Floor, a man by the name of Dahvie Vanity (real name Jesus David Torres). The video was eventually linked to by users of 4chan, who then found and distributed Leonhardt's real name, phone number and address. Leonhardt also responded to comments that their relationship with Vanity constituted statutory rape with anger.

The harassment intensified after Leonhardt uploaded a video that included their father, Gene Leonhardt, insulting and threatening the 4chan users that had posted information about Leonhardt, telling them that they had "done goofed", and that:

The video, which was titled "You Dun Goofed Up", received over 1 million views on YouTube in one week. Leonhardt's father's reaction made the taunting worse, and the video of his reactions received more views than any of Leonhardt's previous recordings, with several quotes from his speech becoming memes themselves. Gene was later arrested in March 2011 for abusing Leonhardt in an argument when he punched them, causing them to have bloody and swollen lips, according to a police report. Gene later died from a heart attack while in custody at a police station in early 2011.

Leonhardt stated that they had lost all of their friends as a result of the harassment. Because of the harassment, Leonhardt was placed under police protection, and the family's home under police surveillance. Leonhardt underwent counseling for harassment. In a subsequent Good Morning America interview, the family revealed that they have received harassment, including death threats. The Marion County, Florida sheriff's department said it was investigating allegations that there were pornographic photos of Leonhardt online. In retaliation for Gawker's coverage of the case, Gawker experienced a series of DoS attacks attributed to 4chan users.

Parry Aftab harassment 

After the Good Morning America interview, the television audience was given advice on how to handle cyberbullying (online bullying and harassment) from internet privacy expert Parry Aftab. Aftab was subsequently subjected to harassment attributed to 4chan users in the forms of Google bombing false accusations of child sexual assault, the distribution of personal information, threatening telephone calls, and DoS attacks against her websites wiredsafety.org and aftab.com. Aftab canceled a follow-up GMA report due to air the next day because of the harassment.

Reactions 
In Australia, advocates of internet censorship invoked the harassment to support mandatory content filtering. In France, L'Express described the harassment as "ruining the life" of "an American in the midst of an adolescent crisis", and France24 noted that some were using the controversy to claim that 4chan should be censored.

The case was seen by BuzzFeed News in 2018 as an example of how attitudes to cyberbullying have changed since 2010, with more emphasis on the victim of abuse.

Later developments: sexual assault allegations 
Rumors of rape and sexual abuse by Vanity had been circulating since 2009. Blood on the Dance Floor members Garrett Ecstasy, who left the band in 2009, and Jayy Von Monroe, who left the band in 2016, have described Vanity as a sexual predator. Jeffree Star and New Years Day members Ash Costello and Nikki Misery have stated that they observed Vanity engage in questionable or illegal sexual behavior during one of the Vans Warped Tours and also during an "All the Rage Tour 2012" around the early 2010s.

On March 2, 2018, Leonhardt made a Tumblr post in which they publicly accused Vanity of rape for the first time.

In March 2020, Leonhardt told journalist Chris Hansen of To Catch A Predator that Vanity sexually assaulted them in April 2009, when Leonhardt was 10 and Vanity was 24. They were interviewed as part of Hansen's YouTube channel Have A Seat With Chris Hansen; Hansen described Leonhardt as Vanity's "victim zero". Leonhardt said they were at a party at which Vanity was present and while they were in the bathroom of the house, Vanity coerced them to perform oral sex on him. During the next 16 months, Leonhardt stated that Vanity had violently raped them under the guise of BDSM style sexual activity. In 2010, Leonhardt told a classmate that Vanity had molested them, but later told Insider that they used the term as a joke, and viewed the relationship as consensual. Leonhardt also stated that had they not mentioned Vanity to classmates – which led to the case being discussed online – the abuse would have continued. One year later, 21 women accused Vanity of sexual assault, child molestation, and rape with many of the women saying that the attacks had taken place while they were under the age of consent. This led to the FBI beginning an investigation into the allegations against Vanity.

References 

2010 YouTube videos
Internet memes introduced in 2010
YouTube controversies
Child sexual abuse
Child sexual abuse in the United States
Slaughter, Jessi
Slaughter, Jessi
Violence against children
Year of birth missing (living people)